Hanna Township may refer to the following townships in the United States:

 Hanna Township, Henry County, Illinois
 Hanna Township, LaPorte County, Indiana